Edward Berkeley (died 1596) was an English politician. He was a Member (MP) of the Parliament of England for Old Sarum in 1586, and sat in the Irish House of Commons in 1585 as an MP for County Antrim.

References

Year of birth missing
1596 deaths
English MPs 1586–1587
Irish MPs 1585–1586
Members of the Parliament of Ireland (pre-1801) for County Antrim constituencies